SnipSnap is an app that will let you receive free coupons.

SnipSnap may also refer to:

 Snip-Snap-Snorum, a matching card game
 Snipp, Snapp, Snurr, fictional book characters
 Snip and Snap, an animated 1960 British television show